Cleopus elegans is a species of true weevils in the subfamily Curculioninae. It was first described in Volla, Italy.

References

External links 

 
 Cleopus elegans at insectoid.info

Beetles described in 1834
Curculioninae
Taxa named by Oronzio Gabriele Costa